The A 15 road is an A-Grade trunk road in Sri Lanka. It connects Batticalao with Trincomallee.

The A 15 passes through Eravur, Morakottanchenai, Valaichenai, Mankerny, Vaharai, Verugal, Serunuwara, Palaithoppur, Muttur, Kinniya and Ganeshapuram to reach Trincomallee.

References

Highways in Sri Lanka
Transport in Eastern Province, Sri Lanka